Takalak may refer to:
 Takalak people, an ethnic group of Australia
 Takalak language, an Australian language
 Oktay Takalak, French boxer

See also 
 Tagalag (disambiguation)
 Tagalak Island

Language and nationality disambiguation pages